Village of Morattico Historic District is a national historic district located at Morattico, Lancaster County, Virginia. The district encompasses 69 contributing buildings, 1 contributing site, and 3 contributing structures in the village of Morattico.  The district includes residential, commercial, and institutional buildings in a community whose economy was based on water-borne transportation, seafood extraction, and seafood processing. The village developed after 1890. Notable buildings include the Morattico General Store (c. 1890), Dr. Lewis' Office (c. 1910), Morattico Post Office (1949), Jackson Seafood (1950), Shelton Crab House, and Emmanuel United Methodist Church (1898).

It was listed on the National Register of Historic Places in 2011.

References

Historic districts on the National Register of Historic Places in Virginia
Buildings and structures in Lancaster County, Virginia
National Register of Historic Places in Lancaster County, Virginia
1890 establishments in Virginia